was a Japanese recording engineer known for his work with film director Akira Kurosawa.

Yanoguchi began working with Kurosawa on the 1949 film Stray Dog, and afterwards began recording the sound for the vast majority of Kurosawa's films until dying late in the production of Ran in 1985. He won the Mainichi Film Award for Best Sound Recording for the 1952 film Ikiru. Yanoguchi also worked on Godzilla films such as Mothra vs. Godzilla (1964)<ref>Steve Ryfle, Japan's Favorite Mon-star: The Unauthorized Biography of 'The Big G''', ECW Press, 1998, p. 355, .</ref> and Godzilla vs. Gigan'' (1972).

Filmography
His work includes:

References

1917 births
1985 deaths
Japanese audio engineers